Medleri  is a village in the southern state of Karnataka, India. It is located in the Ranibennur taluk of Haveri district in Karnataka.

Demographics
 India census, Medleri had a population of 9426 with 4838 males and 4588 females.

See also
 Ranebennur
 Haveri
 Districts of Karnataka

References

External links
 http://Haveri.nic.in/

Villages in Haveri district